Reaper, Wheat Field with Reaper, or Wheat Field with Reaper and Sun is the title given to each of a series of three oil-on-canvas paintings by Vincent van Gogh of a man reaping a wheat field under a bright early-morning sun. To the artist, the reaper represented death and "humanity would be the wheat being reaped". However, Van Gogh did not consider the work to be sad but "almost smiling" and taking "place in broad daylight with a sun that floods everything with a light of fine gold".

The first painting (F617), which is thickly impastoed, was started in June 1889. Work on the piece resumed in early September after the artist suffered a mental breakdown from which it took him several weeks to recover. Van Gogh then created two more stylized versions (F618 and F619) in early and late September 1889. He referred to the paintings as simply , and said that the first was done from nature as a study, while the second, similarly sized version was "the final painting" completed in his studio. He came to prefer the original, and intended the third smaller version as a keepsake for his mother or one of his sisters.

Background 

In May 1889, Vincent van Gogh (1853–1890), a Dutch painter, moved to the Saint-Rémy-de-Provence, France, to commit himself at Saint-Paul-de-Mausole, a psychiatric asylum which was previously a monastery. This presented Van Gogh with a completely different landscape from which to draw inspiration. While Saint-Remy was only  from Arles, his previous residence, it lies below the low massifs of the Alpilles in contrast to the vast plains of Arles.

Van Gogh's bedroom window framed a view of an agrarian landscape that became the focus of the artist's work. A wheat field was located below his window encircled by a wall and hills in the background. The artist made at least 14 paintings and just as many sketches of the scene.

Composition

First painting (F617) 

Van Gogh began painting Reaper (F617) in late June 1889. He first mentions the painting in a 25 June 1889 letter to his brother Theo van Gogh where he describes it as "a wheatfield, very yellow and very bright, perhaps the brightest canvas [he has] done". He writes that it was among 12 paintings on which he was currently working. The painting is mentioned again in a 2 July 1889 letter:

His sickle is only a single brushstroke and barely visible.

With the 2 July letter, Van Gogh included around ten sketches of the paintings he was working on at the time, including a sketch (F1546) of this painting. The painting appears to have been mostly completed by then. However, Van Gogh was making further changes to the work while he described it in more detail in a later letter to his brother written on 4–5 September 1889:

Before writing the letter quoted above, the artist had suffered a severe mental breakdown. In July 1889, he was confined in the asylum for six weeks and was only permitted to paint again in late August. While writing the 4–5 September letter, he touched up the first painting, which he described as a "study", and began working on a new version.

Second painting (F618) 

Van Gogh appears to have completed the second painting in a single day and taking breaks to write the letter on 4–5 September 1889. In a later part of the letter, he announces: "Phew – the reaper is finished, I think it will be one that you'll place in your home".

He initially preferred this version over the earlier study. He described it as:

The "almost smiling" is a reference to an expression used by Théophile Silvestre to describe the death of Eugène Delacroix. Silvestre's eulogy of Delacroix had made an impression on Van Gogh according to a letter he wrote in 15 August 1885 to the painter Anthon van Rappard. Van Gogh also quoted the eulogy in other letters.

There were significant differences between this second painting and version started earlier in the summer. This version was less yellow, with a sky that is more greenish in color, and the Sun was more conical and higher in the sky. He added a small tree near the left edge of the painting along the hills in the background and removed the pile of sheaves from the foreground. Van Gogh eventually came to believe the original painting created from nature was better than the replica which he had intended as "the final painting". Both the first and second version of the painting were still drying on 19 September 1889 and he was not able to include them in the batch he shipped to Theo on that date. The paintings were eventually included in the batch he sent on 28 September, by which time he had completed a third version of the painting.

Third painting (F619) 

In late September 1889, Van Gogh painted reduced versions of several of his earlier works, including a replica of the Reaper similar to the one he made earlier that month, smaller versions of Wheat Field with Cypresses and Bedroom in Arles, and what he called "a little portrait of me", Self-Portrait Without Beard. In particular, he wrote on 6 September 1889: "I really want to redo the reaper one more time for Mother, if not I'll make her another painting for her birthday". The painting was completed and drying by 28 September and, in December 1889, was sent to Theo along with several other small replicas.

Provenance 
Van Gogh died about a year after creating the paintings. His brother, Theo, died a few months later and the two later paintings came to the possession of Theo's widow, Johanna van Gogh-Bonger (later Johanna Cohen Gosschalk-Bonger). The original study was in 1890 either gifted to Paul Gauguin or traded in exchange with the French artist. In 1899, the painting was acquired by Ambroise Vollard from Gauguin's art dealer Georges Chaudet. The piece was then acquired by the art collector Émile Schuffenecker who passed it down to Amédée Schuffenecker, who in turn sold it to Helene Kröller-Müller in April 1912. It has since been in the collection of the Kröller-Müller Museum.

Van Gogh-Bonger and her son loaned the second painting to museums in Amsterdam. In 1909, she loaned the piece to the Rijksmuseum in Amsterdam. After her death in 1925, her son Vincent Willem van Gogh continued to loan the piece to the Rijksmuseum. On 22 October 1931, the painting was loaned to the Stedelijk Museum in Amsterdam. Ownership of the painting was transferred to the Vincent van Gogh Foundation on 10 July 1962 and eleven days later an agreement was reached between the foundation and the State of Netherlands for the preservation and management of the painting as part of a new Van Gogh Museum. While the new museum was built, the painting remained at Stedelijk Museum until 2 June 1973 when it was placed on permanent loan to the Van Gogh Museum.

While Van Gogh intended the third and smaller version of this painting as a gift for either his mother or one of his sisters, it is not known if the painting ever reached them. In May 1902, Van Gogh-Bonger sold the third painting to the German art dealer Paul Cassirer, and it became the first work by Van Gogh to be held by a German museum. The same year, art collector Karl Ernst Osthaus of the Museum Folkwang acquired the painting for his collection in Hagen, Germany. Since 1922, it has been a part of the museum's collection in Essen.

References

Sources

Letters

Books

External links 
 Wheat field with reaper and sun at Kröller-Müller Museum
 Wheatfield with a Reaper at Van Gogh Museum
 The Wheatfield behind Saint Paul's Hospital with a Reaper at Museum Folkwang

1889 paintings
Landscape paintings
Series of paintings by Vincent van Gogh
Collections of the Kröller-Müller Museum
Farming in art